
Złotoryja County is a unit of territorial administration and local government (powiat) in Lower Silesian Voivodeship, south-western Poland. It came into being on January 1, 1999, as a result of the Polish local government reforms passed in 1998. Its administrative seat is Złotoryja, and it also contains the towns of Wojcieszów and Świerzawa.

As of 2019 the total population of the county is 43,719, out of which the population of Złotoryja is 15,564, that of Wojcieszów is 3,668, that of Świerzawa is 2,286, and the rural population is 22,201.

Neighbouring counties
Złotoryja County is bordered by Legnica County to the north-east, Jawor County to the east, Jelenia Góra County to the south, and Lwówek Śląski County and Bolesławiec County to the west.

Administrative division
The county is subdivided into six gminas (two urban, one urban-rural and three rural). These are listed in the following table, in descending order of population.

References

 
Land counties of Lower Silesian Voivodeship